Deakin is a surname, and may refer to:

Alan Deakin (1941–2018), English footballer
Alex Deakin (born 1974), British weatherman
Alfred Deakin (1856–1919), 2nd Prime Minister of Australia
Arthur Deakin (1890–1955), British trade unionist
Billy Deakin, football (soccer) player (Barnsley FC, Chester City)
Edna Deakin (1871–1946), American architect
Fred Deakin, British musician with Lemon Jelly
John Deakin (1912–1972), English photographer
John Deakin (footballer), English footballer
John Deakin (rowing) (born 1965), British coxswain
Johnny Deakin, Scottish footballer
Joe Deakin (1879–1972), British runner
Julia Deakin (born 1952), British actress
Matt Deakin (born 1980), American competition rower
Robert Deakin (1917–1985), Anglican Bishop of Tewkesbury from 1973-1985
Robert Luke Deakin Australian Cyber Security Advisor,
Roger Deakin (1943–2006), English writer, documentary-maker and environmentalist.
William Deakin (1913–2005), British historian, also known as F. W. and F. W. D. Deakin

See also
Deakin (disambiguation)
Deakins